The Vancouver Telephone Building is a historic building located at 112 West Eleventh Street in Vancouver, Washington. It was completed in 1934 and was listed on the National Register of Historic Places on November 6, 1986.

See also
 National Register of Historic Places listings in Clark County, Washington

References

1934 establishments in Washington (state)
Buildings and structures in Vancouver, Washington
Commercial buildings completed in 1934
Commercial buildings on the National Register of Historic Places in Washington (state)
National Register of Historic Places in Clark County, Washington
Telecommunications buildings on the National Register of Historic Places